Nyasa is an administrative ward in Masasi Town Council of Mtwara Region in Tanzania. 
According to the 2012 census, the ward has a total population of 14,368.

References

Wards of Mtwara Region